Keith Clark may refer to:

Keith Clark (bugler), American bugler
Keith Clark (computer scientist), British computer scientist
Keith Clark (conductor), American conductor